Hillhouse may refer to:

People
Alex Hillhouse (1907–1983), Australian athlete who competed in the 1932 Summer Olympics
Art Hillhouse (1916–1980), American professional basketball player
Christa Hillhouse of "4 Non Blondes", an American rock band from San Francisco, California
David Hillhouse Buel (disambiguation)
Euan Hillhouse Methven Cox (1893–1977), Scottish plant collector, botanist, and horticulturist
Gregory L. Hillhouse (1955–2014), American chemistry professor 
James Hillhouse (1754–1832), American lawyer, real estate developer, and politician
James Hillhouse Fuertes (1863–1932), American civil and sanitary engineer
Joanne C. Hillhouse (born 1970s), Antiguan writer and journalist
Raelynn Hillhouse, American national security and Intelligence community analyst, former smuggler, spy novelist and health care executive
Sarah Porter Hillhouse (1763–1831), Georgia's first woman editor and printer
Thomas Hillhouse (adjutant general) (1817–1897), American farmer, banker and politician
Thomas P. Hillhouse, QC (1898–1991), Canadian politician
William Hillhouse FLS (1850–1910), British botany professor
Willie Hillhouse (1891–1968), Scottish footballer with Motherwell, Albion Rovers, Third Lanark
Clifford Hillhouse Pope (1899–1974), American herpetologist
Oliver Hillhouse Prince (1787–1837), American editor, attorney, and politician

Geography
Hillhouse, Hamilton, a housing estate in Hamilton, South Lanarkshire, Scotland
Hillhouse, Mississippi, an unincorporated community in Coahoma County, Mississippi, U.S.
Hillhouse Avenue, in New Haven, Connecticut, U.S.
Hillhouse High School, a high school in New Haven, Connecticut, U.S.
Platform Hillhouse, a platform in the Dos Cuadras Offshore Oil Field, Santa Barbara Channel, California, U.S.
Hillhouse Hollow, a stream valley in the Ozarks of southern Missouri, U.S.

Other
Hillhouse Capital Group, an Asia-based investment management firm
Lord Hillhouse or Earl of Ruglen, a title in the Peerage of Scotland

See also
Hilhouse, a former shipbuilder in Bristol, England
Hill House (disambiguation)
Hiller House (disambiguation)
Hills House (disambiguation)